Just for You is the second album by the American singer-songwriter Neil Diamond. Like his first, it has never been released on CD, though all but two of the tracks were made available on the Classics: The Early Years compilation. All tracks are also available on the compilation album The Bang Years 1966-1968. At some point or another, every single track on it was released either as an A-side or a B-side of a single, with many of them becoming big hits: "You Got to Me" (#18), "Girl, You'll Be a Woman Soon" (#10), "Thank the Lord for the Night Time" (#13), "Red Red Wine" (#62), and "Shilo" (#24 in 1970). Curiously, the year-old hit "Cherry Cherry" (from Diamond's first LP) also appears here, while the then-current hit "Kentucky Woman" (#22) does not. "Solitary Man" also re-appears in its 1966 version. This version would be re-released in 1970 and chart at #21. This was Diamond's first album consisting entirely of original material, and his final album for the Bang label.

Track listing
All songs written by Neil Diamond.

1967 albums
Neil Diamond albums
Bang Records albums
Albums produced by Jeff Barry
Albums produced by Ellie Greenwich